Aurelio Galfetti (2 April 1936 – 5 December 2021) was a Swiss architect.

Biography 
Galfetti was born in Biasca, Ticino, on 2 April 1936. Together with Mario Botta, Luigi Snozzi, and Livio Vacchini, he is one of the foremost 20th century architects from the Canton of Ticino. 

One of his most important works was the renovation of Castelgrande at Bellinzona.

Galfetti died on 5 December 2021, at the age of 85. His nephew is Manuel Valls, former prime minister of France.

Works 
 Casa Rotalinti, 1961, Bellinzona
 Kindergarten in Biasca, 1963–64, Biasca
 Kindergarten, 1966, 1969–70, Lugano
 Städtisches Freibad, 1967–70, Bellinzona
 Kindergarten, 1969–71, Bedano
 School center, 1972, Riva San Vitale
 School, 1972–75, Ascona
 Main post office, 1981–85, Bellinzona
 House Al Portone, 1984–85, Bellinzona
 Tennis courts, 1985–86, Bellinzona
 Leonardo residential building, 1986, Lugano
 Houses Bianco e Nero, 1986, Bellinzona
 Ferreti House, 1988, Gravesano
 Transformation of Castelgrande, 1983–89, Bellinzona
 Mediatheque, 1989–90, Chambéry
 Bâtiment Ulysse, 1991-94, Lausanne
 Aula polivalente, Università della Svizzera italiana (USI), 1999–2002, Lugano
 Net Center, 2006, Padova

References 

Brown-Manrique, Gerardo: The Ticino Guide. New York: Princeton Architectural Press, 1989.

External links
 Website

 

1936 births
2021 deaths
People from Biasca
Architects from Ticino
École Polytechnique Fédérale de Lausanne alumni
Swiss architects